Tash-Asty (Taşaśtı) is a rural locality (a village) in Imendyashevsky Selsoviet, Gafuriysky District, Bashkortostan, Russia. The population was 123 as of 2010. There is 1 street.

Geography 
Tash-Asty is located 56 km northeast of Krasnousolsky (the district's administrative centre) by road. Taishevo is the nearest rural locality.

References 

Rural localities in Gafuriysky District